Denis Umbertovich Valdez Perez (born 26 February 1979 in Moscow) is a former Russian football player.

His father is from Spain and his mother is from Russia.

References

1979 births
Living people
Russian people of Spanish descent
Footballers from Moscow
Russian footballers
FC Elista players
Russian Premier League players
FC Khimik-Arsenal players
Association football goalkeepers
FC Spartak-MZhK Ryazan players